Fictibacillus nanhaiensis is a Gram-positive, aerobic, slightly halophilic, facultatively alkaliphilic, rod-shaped, spore-forming snd motile bacterium from the genus of Fictibacillus which has been isolated from an oyster from the Naozhou Island in China.

References

External links 

Type strain of Fictibacillus nanhaiensis at BacDive -  the Bacterial Diversity Metadatabase

Bacillaceae
Bacteria described in 2011